This is a list of Japanese prefectures by population.
For details of administrative divisions of Japan, see Prefectures of Japan.

Prefectures of Japan ranked by population as of October 1, 2020

Prefectures of Japan ranked by population as of October 1, 2015

Prefectures of Japan ranked by population as of October 1, 2011
Figures here are according to the official estimates of Japan as of October 1, 2011, except for the census population held on October 1, 2010.  Population is given according to the de jure population concept for enumerating the people.  That is, a person was enumerated at the place where they usually lived, and was counted as the population of the area including the place.  Ranks are given by the estimated population as of October 1, 2011.

Historical demography of prefectures of Japan

At the end of war, Japan lost possessions of Southern Sakhalin (Karafuto-fu), Kuril Islands (part of Hokkaidō), Ogasawara Islands (part of Tōkyō-to), Amami and Tokara Islands (part of Kagoshima-ken), Daitō Islands and Ryukyu Islands (Okinawa-ken). For the population of the colonies of the former Empire of Japan, see Demographics of Imperial Japan.

1948 to 2010
Population in the following table is given according to the de jure population concept for enumerating the people.

Source: Census of Japan (as of October 1 for the years of 2015,2010, 2005, 2000, 1995, 1990, 1985, 1980, 1975, 1970, 1965, 1960, 1955 and 1950),
De jure Population Census of Japan (as of August 1, 1948),
Census of Ryūkyū (as of October 1, 1970, December 1, 1960 and December 1, 1950),
Extraordinary Census of Ryūkyū (as of October 1, 1965 and December 1, 1955).

1920 to 1947
Population in the following table is given according to the de facto population concept for enumerating the people.

Source: Extraordinary Census of Japan (as of October 1, 1947),
Population Census of Japan (as of April 26, 1946, November 1, 1945 and February 22, 1944),
Census of Japan (as of October 1 for the years of 1940, 1935, 1930, 1925 and 1920).

1884 to 1918
Population in the following tables is given according to the A-type de facto population concept for enumerating the people, based on koseki registration systems.

Source: Imperial Japan Static Population Statistics (as of December 31 for the years of 1918, 1913, 1908 and 1903),
Imperial Japan Population Statistics (as of December 31, 1898),
Imperial Japan Registered Household Tables (as of December 31 for the years of 1897, 1896, 1895, 1894, 1893, 1892, 1891, 1890, 1889, 1888, 1887 and 1886),
Japan Registered Household Tables (as of January 1, 1886),
Japan Household Tables (as of January 1 for the years of 1885 and 1884).

1872 to 1883
Population in the following table is given according to the  population concept for enumerating the people, based on koseki registration system.

Source: Japan Household Tables (as of January 1 for the years of 1883, 1882, 1878 and 1877),
Japan Population Tables (as of January 1 for the years of 1881 and 1880),
Japan Gun Ku Population Tables (as of January 1, 1879),
Japan Registered Population Tables (as of January 1, for the years of 1876, 1875, 1874 and 1873; and as of March 8, 1872).

1868 to 1871
Several demographic data remain for three ,(i.e. Kyōto-fu, Ōsaka-fu and Tōkyō-fu), 266 , 40  and one  (i.e. Kaitaku-shi only in Hokkaidō) that existed for short time between Meiji Restoration and the Abolition of the han system, though not thoroughly surveyed.
The table below summarizes demographic data from three sources.

Source: (ref.1): Table of households for shi, fu and ken (Meiji-shi-yō).(ref.2): Kokudaka and Population Table of fu, han and ken (Ōkuma Shigenobu collection).(ref.3)''': Bunzo Kure, "Estate population Table of fu, han and ken" Tōkei Shūshi (Statistics Bulletin) no. 8 pp. 96–107 (1882). Estate populations were also given.

Statistical data were given as of August 29, 1871 (29th day of the 8th month, Meiji 4) for (1), as of February 2, 1869 (1st day of the 1st month, Meiji 2), for (2) or uncertain for (3), although all these populations seemed to be collected from several koseki populations surveyed in 1869 and 1870.  Naotarō Sekiyama noted that the population of Japan as of August, 1870 (7th month, Meiji 3) was 32,794,897 (Kinsei Nihon jinkō-no kenkyū (Study of the Population of Japan in the Early Modern Period) (1948)).

It is quite apparent that the above demographic data contain many textual errors, but could not be corrected because the original unpublished reports preserved at the office of the Ministry of Interior of Japan were burned by a fire after the 1923 Great Kantō earthquake.

For demographic data during the Edo period, see Demographics of Japan before Meiji Restoration.

See also
 Government of Japan
 Prefectures of Japan
 List of Japanese prefectures ranked by area
 List of Japanese prefectures by GDP
 List of Japanese prefectures by GDP per capita
 List of Japanese prefectures by life expectancy
 List of Japanese cities by population
 List of Provinces of Japan
 ISO 3166-2 codes for Japan

References

External links
Statistics Bureau of Japan
Kindai Digital Library at the National Diet Library of Japan (original texts in Japanese)
 [tp://kindai.ndl.go.jp/info:ndljp/pid/966032/8 Imperial Japan Static Population Statistics as of December 31, 1918] (with French notations)
 Imperial Japan Static Population Statistics as of December 31, 1913 (with French notations)
 Imperial Japan Static Population Statistics as of December 31, 1908 (de facto'' populations since 1885 with French notations)
 Japan Registered Population Tables as of January 1, 1874 (Japanese only)
 Population of Japan as of August 29, 1871 (Japanese only)
 DSpace at Waseda University
 Kokudaka and population Table (Okuma Shigenobu Collection, original text in Japanese)

Notes

 Population
Prefectures By Population
Japanese prefectures
Population
Ranked lists of country subdivisions